Borderline is the fifty-second studio album by American country music singer Conway Twitty. The album was released in March 1987, by MCA Records.

"I Want to Know You Before We Make Love" was originally recorded by American country music band Alabama on the 1985 album, 40-Hour Week.

Track listing

Personnel
Richard Bennett - acoustic guitar
Vince Gill - background vocals
Emory Gordy Jr. - bass guitar
David Innis - keyboards
John Barlow Jarvis - piano
Mike Lawler - keyboards
Fred Newell - electric guitar
James Stroud - drums
Conway Twitty - lead vocals, background vocals
Reggie Young - electric guitar

Charts

References

1987 albums
Conway Twitty albums
MCA Records albums
Albums produced by Jimmy Bowen